Rieutard may refer to:

 Rieutard Lake, a lake at the head of the Cavée River, in Lac-Jacques-Cartier, Quebec, Canada

See also
 Rieutord, a tributary of the Hérault river in France